La Pobla de Farnals is a municipality in the comarca of Horta Nord in the Valencian Community, Spain.

References

Pobla de Farnals, La
Pobla de Farnals, La